Hector Gilchrist Lusk Mactaggart Kinloch (14 December 1927 – 6 August 1993) was an American-born Australian academic and politician.

Biography
He was born Boston, Massachusetts in 1927.

He travelled to England, where he graduated from Christ's College, Cambridge with first class honours in history in 1949.

After graduating he served in the US Army for three years.  In 1960 he moved to Australia and lectured in history at the University of Adelaide. From 1965-1968 he was Visiting Fulbright Professor of US History at the University of Malaya in Kuala Lumpur.  He joined the Australian National University in Canberra in 1968 and remained there until 1988.

He helped establish the National Association for Gambling Studies and was a vociferous critic of the proposed Casino Canberra.  Given his anti-gambling stance he was invited by Bernard Collaery of the Residents Rally to be a candidate in the inaugural ACT Legislative Assembly election.  He was elected in 1989 and retired in 1992.

Personal Life and Religious Background
Hector Kinloch's childhood was difficult, with many family crises and periods living in Dr Bernado's Homes and foster care.

He was married twice to Anne Russell from 1955 to 1964 (divorce finalized in 1966), and to Lucy Maniam from December 1966 until his death. In 1993 Lucy was still working at Dickson College, ANU.

He was a life-long Christian, and joined the Canberra Regional Meeting of the Society of Friends (Quakers) in May 1971, where he held many active roles. He had a particular interest in the life of the early Quaker John Woolman, and delivered the 1980 Backhouse Lecture on the topic “Quaker Saints and Sinners”.

He travelled widely, including the US, Northern Ireland, England, Australia, and Singapore.

Legacy
Kinloch Circuit in the Canberra suburb of Bruce is named after him, as is the Kinloch UniLodge on the ANU campus, and the north tower of ANU Fenner Hall residence.1

External links and references
 Australian Dictionary of Biography
 Photo of Hector Kinloch, National Archives of Australia
 Death of Dr Kinloch, Condolence Debate, ACT Legislative Assembly 17 August 1993
 Testimony to the Grace of God in the life of Hector Kinloch for the Canberra Regional Meeting of the Religious Society of Friends (Quakers) in Australia.
 Scans of archive records show him:
 being registered for the US draught (order no K-14455-X) on his 18th birthday (despite having emigrated to the UK more than 10 years earlier)
 according to the 1950 US census, living at Fort Dix
 departing New York for Southampton on 
 arriving at New York from Southampton on 
 with Anne arriving at Liverpool from New York on 

Specific

1927 births
1993 deaths
Academic staff of the Australian National University
Members of the Australian Capital Territory Legislative Assembly
Anti-gambling advocates
Residents Rally members of the Australian Capital Territory Legislative Assembly
Alumni of Christ's College, Cambridge
Academic staff of the University of Adelaide
20th-century Australian politicians
American emigrants to Australia